The World Series of Poker Europe (WSOPE) is the first expansion effort of World Series of Poker-branded poker tournaments outside the United States. Since 1970, participants have had to travel to Las Vegas if they wanted to compete in the World Series of Poker (WSOP).  Although the WSOP held circuit events in other locations, the main tournaments, which awarded bracelets to the winners, were exclusively held in Las Vegas. The inaugural WSOPE, held in 2007, marked the first time that a WSOP bracelet was awarded outside Las Vegas.

In 2004, Harrah's Casinos purchased the rights to the WSOP label. Harrah's later purchased London Clubs International (LCI). LCI operates three casinos in the London area: Fifty, Leicester Square, and The Sportsman. After the purchase of these casinos, Harrah's decided to expand its WSOP label into Europe. European casinos typically have a different environment than those in the U.S. Jeffrey Pollack, the WSOP Commissioner, indicated that the WSOPE would have a "style and flair that is both unique and appropriate to the setting. So don't be surprised if we require participants to wear blazers at the tables. If James Bond were hosting a poker tournament it may look like the World Series of Poker Europe."

In marketing the WSOPE, Harrah's Casino did not rely upon the reputation of Harrah's or the WSOP alone. On July 5, 2007, Harrah's announced its alliance with England-based Betfair, one of the largest online gaming companies in the world. The agreement builds on Betfair's European reputation in advertising the WSOPE while creating the largest agreement between a web-based and brick-and-mortar casinos. Due to changes in U.S. laws, effective in 2007, the WSOP could no longer accept money from online gambling companies. This prevented the WSOP from acknowledging WSOP qualifiers from online events. The WSOPE is not bound by this limitation. The United Kingdom Gambling Act of 2005 allows for legal regulated online poker sites. Furthermore, as the laws that govern the age of gambling differ in England than the U.S., the WSOPE admits younger players. In 2007, four of the five finalists at the first event of the WSOPE had won bracelets. Thomas Bihl, however, outlasted each of them to claim the first-ever WSOPE bracelet.  No previous bracelet winners played at the second final table; Dario Alioto won the bracelet. Annette "Annette_15" Obrestad, became the youngest player to win a WSOP bracelet event at 18 years and 364 days old in the final event of the tournament. As of 2016, Obrestad's record still stands.

Key

Results

Event 1: £2,500 H.O.R.S.E.

 3-day event: Thursday, September 6, 2007, to Saturday, September 8, 2007
 Number of buy-ins: 105
 Total Prize Pool: £
 Number of Payouts: 16
 Winning Hand: 
 Reference:

Event 2: £5,000 Pot Limit Omaha

 2-day event: Saturday, September 8, 2007, to Sunday, September 9, 2007
 Number of buy-ins: 165
 Total Prize Pool: £
 Number of Payouts: 18
 Winning Hand: 
 Reference:

Event 3: £10,000 No Limit Hold'em Main Event

 7-day event: Monday, September 10, 2007, to Sunday, September 16, 2007
 Number of buy-ins: 362
 Total Prize Pool: £
 Number of Payouts: 36
 Winning Hand: 
 Reference:'''

References

 

World Series of Poker Europe
2007 in poker